Uyazybashevo (Öyäźebaş) is a rural locality (a selo) in Bolshekarkalinksy Selsoviet, Miyakinsky District, Bashkortostan, Russia. The population was 423 as of 2010. There are 4 streets.

Geography 
Uyazybashevo is located 21 km southeast of Kirgiz-Miyaki (the district's administrative centre) by road. Dubrovka is the nearest rural locality.

References 

Rural localities in Miyakinsky District